Kozarevets is a village in Northern Bulgaria. The village is located in Lyaskovets Municipality, Veliko Tarnovo Province. Аccording to the numbers counted by the 2020 Bulgarian census, Kozarevets currently has a population of 890 people with a permanent address registration in the settlement.

Geography 
Kozarevets village is located in Northern Bulgaria, 11 kilometers away southeast from Veliko Tarnovo, and 4 kilometers away from Lyaskovets. The elevation in the village varies between 50 and 99 meters with an average of 83 meters. Kozarevets is closely located near the river Yantra, the majority of the land area are plains used for agricultural purposes. There are many industrial enterprises in Kozarevets Village. There are furniture manufacturing facilities, oil mills, confectionery houses, and companies producing construction materials.

History and Culture 
The first mentions of Kozarevets village date back to the 18th century. The village also has an active theatre with a local troop that performs on a seasonal basis. There is free wi-fi in the community hall for all.

Buildings 

 Library and community hall “Zemedelets” was built in 1899 
 Theatre
 Pensioner's club

Ethnicity 
According to the Bulgarian population census in 2011.

References 

Villages in Veliko Tarnovo Province